1936 in philosophy

Events

Publications 
 Jacques Maritain, Integral Humanism (1936)
 John Maynard Keynes, The General Theory of Employment, Interest and Money (1936)
 Walter Benjamin, The Work of Art in the Age of Mechanical Reproduction (1936)
 Jean Piaget, The Origin of Intelligence in the Child (1936)
 A. J. Ayer, Language, Truth, and Logic (1936)
 Alan Watts, The Spirit of Zen (1936)

Births 
 January 31 – Michel Hulin
 February 18 - Ian Hacking 
 August 26 - Benedict Anderson (died 2015)
 November 28 - Carol Gilligan

Deaths 
 April 9 - Ferdinand Tönnies (born 1855)
 May 8 - Oswald Spengler (born 1880) 
 June 12 - Karl Kraus (born 1874)
 June 14 - G. K. Chesterton (born 1874)
 June 22 - Moritz Schlick (born 1882)
 July 25 - Heinrich Rickert (born 1863)
 December 31 - Miguel de Unamuno (born 1864)

References 

Philosophy
20th-century philosophy
Philosophy by year